The Royal Martyr Church Union (RMCU) is a Church of England devotional society dedicated to the restoration of the observance of King Charles the Martyr in the calendar of the Book of Common Prayer. It was founded in 1906 by Captain Henry Stuart Wheatly-Crowe (1882-1967). Like the Society of King Charles the Martyr, the RMCU hosts an annual commemoration of the beheading of Charles I of England. It has historically had close connections with Jacobitism. Among other activities, the RMCU funded the construction of the Church of King Charles the Martyr in Potters Bar in the Diocese of St Albans. The current headquarters of the RMCU is at St Albans in Hertfordshire.

Bibliography 
The Royal Martyr Annual, 1932—

See also
Jacobitism
Ritualism
Oxford Movement

References 
Members of the San Luigi Orders: Henry Stuart Wheatly-Crowe
John Wolffe, Sacred and Secular Martyrdom in Britain and Ireland since 1914 (Bloomsbury), p. 46.
Catherine Pepinster, Martyrdom: Why Martyrs Still Matter (SPCK).
Jolyon Mitchell, Martyrdom: A Very Short Introduction (Oxford University Press), p. 99.
Andrew Lacey, The Cult of King Charles the Martyr (Studies in Modern British Religious History) (Boydell Press, 2003).

External links 
King Charles the martyr. Royal martyr church union hold annual commemoration service British Pathé film
A Jacobitism for the Twenty-first Century by Charles Coulombe

Jacobitism
Church of England societies and organisations
Anglo-Catholicism
Religious organizations established in 1906
Charles I of England
1906 establishments in the United Kingdom